The SIN R1 is a sports car made by Bulgarian manufacturers SIN Cars. The R1 features an FIA certified tube frame construction, carbon fiber body and an active rear spoiler. It came with 3 different engine choices – LS3 (6.2 liter N/A V8), LS7 (7.0 liter N/A V8) and a LS9 (6.2 liter supercharged V8). The only transmission offered is a 6 speed manual.

Background 
Rosen Daskalov, the founder of SIN Cars & former racing driver, was working with a British business partner at The United Kingdom in 2012, but after a number of disagreements they went their separate ways. Daskalov also moved the company back to his hometown and continued developing the R1.

Model information 
The R1 series includes 3 models (450 , 550 & 650) for road and 2 models (VTX & GT4) for track. The first R1 was revealed in track-only prototype form in 2013 at the Autosport International show. In 2014, a road-going prototype was shown. The R1 will be produced no more than 20 models annually. It is built around a strong, heavy and relatively easy-to-make tubular spaceframe chassis, not a carbonfibre monocoque. Nonetheless the car is still light at around 1,250 kg.

There are 3 different engine - LS based GM small-block engine (6.2 liter N/A V8, 7.0 liter N/A V8 & 6.2 liter supercharged V8) for choices. The 7.0-litre naturally aspirated engine tested here has its pistons and bearings replaced with high performance items. A dry sump lubrication system is better fitted for track driving, which means the engine can be positioned lower in the chassis – and it uses a bespoke, part-titanium exhaust.

The bodywork of R1 is all carbon and the rear wing is active. The brakes are supplied by AP Racing and the dampers by Öhlins. For the suspension, it uses double wishbones all round with in-board mounted springs and dampers, racing car style. A sequential paddleshift gearbox and a traditional six-speed manual can be chosen freely, and there’s a limited-slip differential.

Specification

References

External links 

 Official website
 
 

Cars of Bulgaria
Sports cars
Rear mid-engine, rear-wheel-drive vehicles
Cars introduced in 2013